Wittrockia gigantea is a plant species in the genus Wittrockia.

The bromeliad is endemic to the Atlantic Forest biome (Mata Atlantica Brasileira), located in southeastern Brazil.  It is native within Minas Gerais, Rio de Janeiro (state), and São Paulo (state).

Cultivars and hybrids
Cultivars and hybrids include:
 Wittrockia 'Leopardinum'
 Neorockia 'Midhurst'

References

gigantea
Endemic flora of Brazil
Flora of the Atlantic Forest
Flora of Minas Gerais
Flora of Rio de Janeiro (state)
Flora of São Paulo (state)